Making Contact is the eleventh studio album released by the British hard rock band UFO in January 1983. This is the first album without founder and bassist Pete Way. UFO disbanded after an unsuccessful European tour and a few UK dates in 1983.

Track listing

Personnel 
UFO
Phil Mogg – lead vocals
Paul Chapman – lead guitar, bass guitar
Neil Carter – keyboards, rhythm guitar, bass guitar (on tracks 1, 5, 8 & 9), backing vocals
Paul Gray – bass guitar (on bonus tracks 12 & 13)
Andy Parker – drums

Production
Mick Glossop – producer, engineer
Peter Thea, Richard Mainwaring – engineers
Gavin McKillop, Keith Nixon, Leigh Mantle – assistant engineers
Alan Adler – illustration
John Pasche, Andrew Ellis – art direction

Charts
Album 

Singles

References

1983 albums
UFO (band) albums
Chrysalis Records albums
Albums with cover art by Hipgnosis